Rex L. Repass is a US-based public opinion and marketing research executive. He is president of Research America Inc., headquartered in Newtown Square, Pennsylvania with offices in Cincinnati, Ohio and throughout the US.  Research America Inc. acquired R.L. Repass & Partners, Inc. (dba REPASS®) in 2016. In 2015 and 2016, Inc. magazine selected the REPASS firm as one of the fastest growing, privately held companies in the US.

Biography
Repass is a native of Charleston, West Virginia and a 1976 graduate of Marshall University in Huntington, West Virginia. He was a member of the Young Thundering Herd football team  in the early 1970s following the tragic plane crash  that claimed the lives of 75 players, coaches, athletic administrators, and team boosters. In 1994, Repass was elected to Marshall's W. Page Pitt School of Journalism & Mass Communications Hall of Fame for his contribution to media and public opinion research.

In 1977, Repass received a master of science degree in communications from the University of Tennessee-Knoxville, with a special emphasis in public opinion and advertising research.

In 1980, Repass developed The West Virginia Poll for the Charleston Daily Mail, WSAZ Television and The Associated Press.  The West Virginia Poll  was the first media sponsored scientific measurement of public opinion in West Virginia. The West Virginia Poll continues to this day and is sponsored  by the MetroNews Radio Network.

In 1988, Repass moved his research practice from Charleston, West Virginia to MarketVision Research Inc. in Cincinnati, Ohio where he was president of the organization. In 2001, he sold his interest in MarketVision and formed what became R.L. Repass & Partners Inc.

Today Repass and the Research America Inc. organization provide survey research and strategic consulting services to Fortune 500 corporations, state and national trade associations, and governmental agencies. He has also directed public opinion and market research for media clients including The Arizona Republic, The Sunday Examiner-Chronicle in San Francisco, The Poynter Institute for Media Studies, Thomson Reuters and more than 40 newspapers and media companies in the United States and Canada.

Repass is a member of the American Association for Public Opinion Research.

See also
 Quantitative marketing research
 Qualitative marketing research
 Brand Equity
 Advertising Research
 Observational techniques
 Online research communities

Articles
 Cincinnati Business Courier
 Philadelphia 100 Past Winners
 Research America Acquires Natural Marketing Institute
 West Virginia Poll: split on state’s direction
 3 Ways Market Research Can Bolster Your Marketing Creative
 5 Reasons You Should Hire a Market Research Firm
 UX Research in Action – Some of Research America's Case Studies
 Crisis Communications Experience

References

University of Tennessee alumni
Marshall University alumni
Marshall Thundering Herd football players
Market researchers
Living people
Year of birth missing (living people)
People from Charleston, West Virginia